Ardabilak (also Romanized as Ardabīlak; also known as Ardāvīlāq) is a village in Eqbal-e Gharbi Rural District, in the Central District of Qazvin County, Qazvin Province, Iran. At the 2006 census, its population was 801, in 231 families.

References 

Populated places in Qazvin County